The Kraków Voivodeship was a voivodeship (province) with capital in Kraków, that was located in the southern Lesser Poland. It existed from 1945 to 1975. Until 19 February 1947, it was part of the Republic of Poland, which then was replaced by the Polish People's Republic. It was established on 28 June 1945, from the occupied territories of the Kraków District, General Government, and the Province of Upper Silesia, Germany. In 1957, the city of Kraków separated from the voivodeship, forming a separate administrative division. It ceased to exist on 31 May 1975, when it was partitioned into then-established Kraków Metropolitan, Nowy Sącz, Tarnów, Biała, Katowice, and Kielce Voivodeships.

Subdivisions

1945–1973 
 Jaworzno (city county) (1956–1973)
 Kraków (city county) (1945–1957)
 Nowy Sącz (city county) (1951–1973)
 Tarnów (city county) (1951–1973)
 Zakopane (city county) (1951–1973)
 Biała County (seat: Biała Krakowska) (1945–1950)
 Bochnia County (seat: Bochnia)
 Brzesko County (seat: Brzesko)
 Chrzanów County (seat: Chrzanów)
 Dąbrowa County (seat: Dąbrowa Tarnowska)
 Dębica County (seat: Dębica) (1945)
 Gorlice County (seat: Gorlice) (1945)
 Jasło County (seat: Jasło) (1945)
 Kraków County (seat: Kraków)
 Limanowa County (seat: Limanowa)
 Miechów County (seat: Miechów)
 Mielec County (seat: Mielec (1945)
 Myślenice County (seat: Myślenice)
 Nowy Sącz County (seat: Nowy Sącz)
 Nowy Targ County (seat: Nowy Targ)
 Olkusz County (seat: Olkusz)
 Oświęcim County (seat: Oświęcim) (1951–1973)
 Tarnów County (seat: Tarnów)
 Wadowice County (seat: Wadowice)
 Żywiec County (seat: Żywiec)

1973–1975 
 Jaworzno (city county)
 Nowy Sącz (city county)
 Tarnów (city county)
 Bochnia County (seat: Bochnia)
 Brzesko County (seat: Brzesko)
 Chrzanów County (seat: Chrzanów)
 Kraków County (seat: Kraków)
 Limanowa County (seat: Limanowa)
 Miechów County (seat: Miechów)
 Myślenice County (seat: Myślenice)
 Nowy Sącz County (seat: Nowy Sącz)
 Nowy Targ County (seat: Nowy Targ)
 Olkusz County (seat: Olkusz)
 Oświęcim County (seat: Oświęcim)
 Proszowice County (seat: Proszowice)
 Sucha County (seat: Sucha Beskidzka)
 Tarnów County (seat: Tarnów)
 Wadowice County (seat: Wadowice)
 Żywiec County (seat: Żywiec)

Awards 
 Order of the Builders of People's Poland (1966)

Gallery

Citations

Notes

References 

History of Lesser Poland
History of Kraków
Former voivodeships of Poland (1945–1975)
States and territories established in 1945
States and territories disestablished in 1945
1945 establishments in Poland
1975 disestablishments in Poland
Recipients of the Order of the Builders of People's Poland